Bradford R. Hill (born January 22, 1967) is an American politician represented the 4th Essex district in the Massachusetts House of Representatives from 1999 to 2021. He was the First Assistant Minority Leader.

Representative Hill resigned his post as a State Representative on September 15, 2021 to take a position on the Massachusetts Gaming Commission. He was appointed by Governor Charlie Baker and other state officials.

Prior to his election to the House, Hill served on the Ipswich Board of Selectmen and the Hamilton Zoning Board of Appeals.

See also
 2019–2020 Massachusetts legislature
 2021–2022 Massachusetts legislature

References

Living people
1967 births
People from Ipswich, Massachusetts
Salem State University alumni
Republican Party members of the Massachusetts House of Representatives
Politicians from Boston
21st-century American politicians